Pansepta ereboglauca is a moth in the family Xyloryctidae. It was described by Edward Meyrick in 1926. It is found on Borneo.

References

Pansepta
Moths described in 1926